Bryan Allen may refer to:

Bryan Allen (hang glider) (born 1952), American hang glider pilot and bicyclist
Bryan Allen (ice hockey) (born 1980), Canadian hockey player

See also
Brian Allen (disambiguation)
Bryon Allen (born 1992), American basketball player
Bryn Allen (1921–2005), Welsh international footballer
Allen (surname)